Rozvan may refer to:
 Eugen Rozvan, Hungarian communist lawyer
 Rozvan, Iran (disambiguation), places in Iran